The 1876 United States presidential election in Delaware took place on November 7, 1876, as part of the 1876 United States presidential election. Delaware voters chose three representatives, or electors, to the Electoral College, who voted for president and vice president.

Delaware was won by Samuel J. Tilden, the former governor of New York (D–New York), running with Thomas A. Hendricks, the governor of Indiana and future vice president, with 55.45% of the popular vote, against Rutherford B. Hayes, the governor of Ohio (R-Ohio), running with Representative William A. Wheeler, with 44.55% of the vote.

Results

See also
 United States presidential elections in Delaware

References

Delaware
1876
1876 Delaware elections